Jonas Sparring (born November 6, 1988) is a Swedish  professional ice hockey goaltender. He played with Färjestads BK in the Elitserien during the 2010–11 Elitserien season.

Sparring competed at the 2011 IIHF InLine Hockey World Championship.

References

External links

1988 births
Färjestad BK players
Living people
Swedish ice hockey goaltenders